Thomas Jefferson High School, or simply Jefferson High School, is one of the two high schools in Bloomington, Minnesota, United States Independent School District No. 271.  It is located at 102nd Street and France Avenue on the suburb's southwest side, and is part of the Bloomington Public Schools district.  About 1,600 students attend in grades 9 through 12. The mascot is a Jaguar.

Jefferson was named a National Blue Ribbon School of Excellence by the US Department of Education in 2009, although the school has had a solid academic reputation within the state for some time.

In 2010, after many years in the Lake Conference, both Jefferson and Bloomington Kennedy became founding members of the South Suburban Conference sponsored by the Minnesota State High School League.  League activities include athletics, academic teams, drama, and music. Kennedy and Jefferson have been cross-town rivals for many years, and face off each year in what's known by most as the Battle of B-Town.

Activities and athletics
Bloomington Jefferson is a member of the Metro West Conference in the Minnesota State High School League. The school had been a member of the Lake Conference from its opening until it left to become as a founding member of the new South Suburban Conference in 2010. The school then left the South Suburban Conference in 2014 to become as a founding member of the new Metro West Conference.

The 2000–2001 boys hockey team is the subject of the 2003 book Blades of Glory by John Rosengren.

State Championships

Performing arts
Jefferson has two competitive show choirs, the mixed gender "Connection" and the all female "Jive". Along with choirs, the school has multiple band programs, including concert bands, marching bands, jazz ensembles, and orchestras.

Principals
Robert H. Smith 1970-1985
Kent Stever 1985-1996
John Bianchi 1996-1998
Lyle Odland 1998-2002
Steven Hill 2002-2013
Kevin Groebner 2013–2016
Jaysen Anderson 2016–Present

Notable alumni

Cole Aldrich – Former NBA Center, Minnesota Timberwolves
Matthew Bribitzer-Stull, PhD—Head of University Honors Program, University of MN
Thomas E. Burnett Jr. – one of the passengers aboard United Flight 93 on September 11, 2001
Ben Clymer – retired NHL left wing
Brian Connelly – defenseman, Rockford IceHogs
Mike Crowley – retired NHL defenseman
Brian Dutcher - Head Coach, San Diego State Aztecs men's basketball
Steve Edlefsen – former MLB pitcher, San Francisco Giants
Lisa Garoutte, PhD -- Professor of Sociology, Loras College
Paul Gess – former NHL left wing for the Montreal Canadiens
Tom Gilbert – 11 year NHL defenseman
 Julia Hart - Professional wrestler
 Rina Heisel – award-winning PBS documentary producer
Caleb Herbert – forward (ice hockey), South Carolina Stingrays
Ben Hendrickson – former MLB pitcher
Christine Jax – former Commissioner of Education for the state of Minnesota
Lane Kiffin – Head Coach, Ole Miss Rebels football
Tom Kurvers – retired NHL defenseman, 1984 Hobey Baker Memorial Award Winner
Lloyd Lee – former NFL coach
Nik Lentz – Minnesota State Champion wrestler; professional Mixed Martial Artist, currently for the UFC
Kevin Lynch – retired NBA forward
Dr. Robert McDonald, MD, PhD -- Neuroradiologist and Biophysicist, Mayo Clinic
Frank Moe - Minnesota state legislator and educator
Mark Parrish – retired NHL forward, KFAN initial's game star; high school hockey coach
Tom Pederson – retired NHL defenseman
Toby Petersen – right wing, Dallas Stars
Mod Sun – singer, rapper, and songwriter; birth name Derek Smith
Tom Ruud – former NFL linebacker, 19th pick in 1975 NFL Draft
Dan Trebil – retired NHL defenseman
Joe Stansberry – Professional Golfer, PGA Tour, Senior PGA Tour and European Senior Tour.

Construction and original curriculum

Thomas Jefferson High School in Bloomington was constructed to support a new curriculum offering. This curriculum used a Modular Scheduling approach to scheduling, based loosely on a lecture attendance and test attendance policy. Students were required to attend a certain number of class lectures a week, as well as test-times.

This approach called for a number of large 'lecture hall' type rooms, which could be subdivided if necessary.

The 'mod' approach was cancelled, beginning with the 1979–1980 school year, leaving a school ill-constructed for a more traditional subject-based classroom. In response, many of the large rooms were repartitioned into smaller class-rooms with thin, somewhat flexible walls. These walls did not block noise well, but created a perception of smaller classrooms, and were in use at least until the late 1990s.

Many of the teachers who came to Jefferson on its inception to be part of the new curriculum stayed on as it transitioned to a more traditional approach.

In 2011–2012 Jefferson switched from a traditional block schedule to a new 6 period schedule on Monday, Tuesday, Friday, and 3 periods on Wednesday, and Thursday. This new schedule offers students the opportunity to take early bird classes that commence before school starts, 6:50–7:41.

In the 2014–2015 school year, the school inserted five weeks of a modified block schedule called "Superblock."  On Mondays and Tuesdays, students have 3 periods a day, each being two hours long.  On Wednesdays and Thursdays, students still have 3 periods, but they are only an hour-and-a-half long and students are released early on these days.  Friday follows the normal 6 period day.  This schedule is used to accommodate state-mandated testing, such as the Minnesota Comprehensive Assessments (MCAs) and MAP exams.

Class sizes

1978 – 898
1990 – 432
1994 – 402
2011 – 401
2015 – 420
2016 – 360

References

External links
Jefferson High School Website
Bloomington Public Schools Official Website

Buildings and structures in Bloomington, Minnesota
Educational institutions established in 1970
1970 establishments in Minnesota
High schools in Bloomington, Minnesota
Public high schools in Minnesota